Urayasu D-Rocks, commonly known as the D-Rocks, or the Shining Arcs, is a rugby union team owned by NTT Communications and is part of Japan's Rugby League One competition, currently in Division 2. Given the name, the team is based in Urayasu City, Chiba Prefecture in the Kantō region. The team has undergone sevenral re-brands throughout is history, most recently in 2022, rebranding from Shining Arcs Tokyo-Bay Urayasu in line with the newsly formed Japan Rugby League One competition in 2021/22, to the Urayasu D-Rocks in 2022 onwards.

History and name 
 
 
NTT Communications RFC was founded in 1976. They won promotion to the expanded Top League of 14 teams at the end of the 2009–10 season. They made their Top League debut for the 2010–11 season. After their first season, they finished 12th place with 4 wins and 9 losses. They had to play a play-off to keep themselves in the Top League, in which they beat Canon Eagles 31–19. In the 2011–12 season, they finished in ninth place.

In July 2022, following the establishment of a new rugby business and sports company by parent company NTT, the Shining Arcs formally rebranded to the Urayasu D-Rocks. The new company, NTT Sports X, was established at the end of the 2022 season and is alleged to have begun with JP¥2.5 billion (US$17.8 million) in capital.

Current squad
The Urayasu D-Rocks is for the 2023 season:

 * denotes players qualified to play for the Japan on dual nationality or residency grounds.

Notable former players
  Mark Gerrard - Melbourne Rebels and former Wallaby
  Brad Mika - Former Auckland Blues player and played for New Zealand
  Adam Wallace-Harrison - Former Queensland Reds player
  Sosene Anesi - Player for Chiefs and NSW Waratahs and New Zealand
  Craig Wing - former professional rugby league footballer for Australia
  JP Nel - Former Blue Bulls player
  Fotunuupule Auelua - Plays for Brumbies
  Alesana Tuilagi - Plays for Newcastle Falcons
  Isaac Ross - Lock (2011–20, 89 games), Allblack (2009, 8 caps)
  Amanaki Mafi - Loose Forward (2014–21, 53 games), Japanese international (2014–, 29 caps)

Home ground
 The Shining Arcs' home stadium is the NTT Grand Chiba Stadium in Ichikawa.

See also
Top League

References

External links
 

Japan Rugby League One teams
Sports teams in Chiba Prefecture
Rugby in Kantō
Rugby clubs established in 1976
Tourist attractions in Chiba Prefecture
NTT Communications
1976 establishments in Japan